Irmgard Flügge-Lotz, née Lotz (16 July 1903 – 22 May 1974) was a German-American mathematician and aerospace engineer. She was a pioneer in the development of the theory of discontinuous automatic control, which has found wide application in hysteresis control systems; such applications include guidance systems, electronics, fire-control systems, and temperature regulation. She became the first female engineering professor at Stanford University in 1961 and the first female engineer elected a Fellow of the American Institute of Aeronautics and Astronautics.

Early life and education
Lotz was born in Hamelin, Germany on 16 July 1903. She was encouraged at an early age to pursue technical subjects by her mother, whose family had been involved in construction for several generations. She often visited construction sites with her uncle and attended half-price matinee shows for technical films. After her father, Osark, a travelling journalist, was drafted for military service in World War I, the young Irmgard helped the family by becoming a math tutor while studying at a girls' Gymnasium in Hanover. Several years later, when Osark returned to Hanover he was in poor health and Irmgard continued to work to bring in extra money for the family. She graduated from the Gymnasium in 1923 and entered the Leibniz University Hannover to study mathematics and engineering. Later in life, she explained why she decided to study engineering:

In college she studied applied mathematics and fluid dynamics and was often the only woman in her classes. In 1927, she received her Diplom-Ingenieur and remained in Hanover for her doctorate. In 1929 she earned her doctorate in engineering, publishing her thesis on the mathematical theory of circular cylinders and heat conduction.

Lotz went to work for the Aerodynamische Versuchsanstalt (AVA) in Göttingen, one of the most prominent aeronautical research institutions in Europe. She joined as a junior research engineer and worked closely with Ludwig Prandtl and Albert Betz, two of the leading German aerodynamicists of the time. Prior to her arrival at the AVA, Prandtl had been unsuccessfully working on solving a differential equation for his lifting-line theory for the spanwise lift distribution of an airplane wing. Lotz was able to overcome his difficulties and solve the equation, and additionally developed a relatively simple method for practical use. She published what is now known as the "Lotz method" in 1931 for calculating the lift on a three-dimensional wing, and it became a standard technique used internationally. Following this achievement, she was promoted to team leader and built the theoretical department at the AVA by establishing her own research program and assisting other research groups.

In 1932, she met Wilhelm Flügge, who was a civil engineer and privatdozent at the University of Göttingen. As they prepared to marry, Lotz's career progressed well and by the time they married in 1938 she had been appointed Head of the Department of Theoretical Aerodynamics. However, Flügge was branded "politically unreliable" and denied promotion at Göttingen for his anti-Nazi views. Flügge later recalled that while he was denied because of his political views, Lotz was "blocked from any possibility of ever getting into a university career, just because of being a woman". The escalation and increasing influence of Nazi policies on academia led to their departure from the AVA and they moved to the Deutsche Versuchsanstalt für Luftfahrt (DVL) in Berlin where Flügge-Lotz (her married name) was a consultant in aerodynamics and flight dynamics and Flügge was appointed Chief of Structures Research. Although banned from academic positions due to Nazi policies, they were permitted to continue their research activities under the protection of Hermann Göring, who was more concerned with technical expertise than ideological purity.

At DVL Flügge-Lotz began her career in automatic control theory and pioneered the theory of discontinuous control systems. These control systems, also known as "on-off" and "bang-bang" systems, have only two or three input settings and are simple to manufacture and very reliable in practical application. She was mainly interested in the implications these systems had for the development of simple automatic flight control equipment. However, the theory describing their performance needed to be developed before they could be reliably implemented in physical systems. Flügge-Lotz began developing the theory while at DVL, but wartime priorities limited her time for heavily theoretical projects so she focused mainly on aerodynamics during this time.

Move to France
As World War II progressed, Berlin was increasingly subject to bombing raids by the Allies. In the spring of 1944, the destruction of Berlin had progressed so far that Flügge-Lotz and Flügge moved with their departments to the small town Saulgau in the hills of southern Germany. After the end of the war, Saulgau was in the French zone of Allied-occupied Germany. The French relaunched their aeronautical research activity and were eager to hire German scientists, so in 1947 Flügge-Lotz and Flügge moved with many of their colleagues to Paris to join the Office National d'Etudes et de Recherches Aerospatiales (ONERA). Flügge-Lotz served as Chief of a research group in aerodynamics until 1948 and published papers in both automatic control theory and aerodynamics, in which she discussed the problems arising from the increased speed of aircraft.

Career at Stanford University
Although Flügge-Lotz and her husband were happy living in Paris, the positions they held there provided limited opportunity for advancement. They wrote to Stephen Timoshenko at Stanford University casually asking about working in the United States and in 1948, and both received offers to teach there. However, at the time Stanford held a university policy that husband and wife could not hold professional rank in the same department, and despite Flügge-Lotz's reputation in research, she had to accept the relatively minor position of "lecturer" as her husband became professor.

Despite lacking of a professorial title, she immediately began accepting students for PhD dissertation research in aerodynamic theory, and in the spring of 1949, taught her first Stanford course in boundary layer theory. At Stanford, Flügge-Lotz conducted research in numerical methods to solve boundary layer problems in fluid dynamics, making pioneering contributions with finite difference methods and the use of computers. In 1951 she set up a weekly fluid mechanics seminar for first-year graduate students to provide a forum for discussing the latest ideas and developments.

Discontinuous automatic control theory
In addition to fluid mechanics, Flügge-Lotz returned to her work on automatic control theory initially started at DVL. She developed new courses and began advising student theses on the subject. She published the first textbook on discontinuous automatic control in 1953. A reviewer of her textbook wrote that:

Since automatic control devices often found application in electronics, she also began collaborating with faculty and students in the Department of Electrical Engineering. Over time, her primary research efforts went increasingly into control theory, and in 1968, the year of her retirement, she published her second book, Discontinuous and Optimal Control.

Tenure
By the mid-1950s, it became evident that Flügge-Lotz was performing all the duties of a full Professor but without official recognition. In fact, it was hard for students to understand why she was a Lecturer rather than a Professor, or even what the difference meant. The disparity of her status as a Lecturer became more apparent when she was the only female delegate from the United States at the first Congress of the International Federation of Automatic Control in Moscow. To address the issue before school opened for the fall quarter, she was appointed a full Professor in both Engineering Mechanics and in Aeronautics and Astronautics in 1961.

Legacy
Flügge-Lotz retired in 1968 at age 65, but continued to conduct research on satellite control systems, heat transfer, and high-speed vehicle drag. During her lifetime, she received many honors for her work. In 1970, she was elected a Fellow of the American Institute of Aeronautics and Astronautics (AIAA) and chosen to give the von Kármán lecture to the AIAA in 1971. She received the Achievement Award by the Society of Women Engineers in 1970, and received an honorary doctorate from the University of Maryland in 1973. The citation for her honorary degree stated:

She was also a senior member of the Institute of Electrical and Electronics Engineers (IEEE), a member of Sigma Xi, and a member of the advisory boards of several scientific journals.

In honor of her contributions, the “Wilhelm Flügge and Irmgard Flügge-Lotz Memorial Award" was established by the Applied Mechanics Division at Stanford University for outstanding graduate students.

Death
Flügge-Lotz's health deteriorated after her retirement and she suffered increasingly severe pain from arthritis that spread over her body. On May 22, 1974, Flügge-Lotz died in Stanford Hospital after a long illness.

Works
 Die Erwärmung des Stempels beim Stauchvorgang, Dissertation TH Hannover 1929
 Discontinuous Automatic Control, Princeton University Press 1953
 Discontinuous and Optimal Control, McGraw Hill 1968

Bibliography
 J. R. Spreiter & W. Flügge, Irmgard Flügge-Lotz in  p. 33-40

See also
German inventors and discoverers
List of people in systems and control

References

External links
"Imrgard Flugge-Lotz", Biographies of Women Mathematicians, Agnes Scott College
Biography of Flugge-Lotz from IEEE

1903 births
1974 deaths
People from Hamelin
20th-century German mathematicians
German women mathematicians
Stanford University School of Engineering faculty
German aerospace engineers
Control theorists
Fellows of the American Institute of Aeronautics and Astronautics
Aerodynamicists
Fluid dynamicists
20th-century German inventors
Women inventors
University of Hanover alumni
German emigrants to the United States
20th-century women mathematicians
20th-century American inventors
Engineers from Lower Saxony
20th-century German women